David C. Cassidy is an American historian of science and professor emeritus at Hofstra University, Hempstead, New York. He is best known for his contributions to the history of quantum mechanics, scientific biography, history of physics in Germany and the United States and, most recently, science-history drama.

Education
Born August 10, 1945 in Richmond, Virginia, Cassidy attended schools in Detroit, Michigan; Louisville, Kentucky; and northern New Jersey. His father, trained in history and business, was a labor-relations executive at the Ford Motor Company. His mother, a survivor of the Armenian genocide, became a librarian.
He received the BA (1967) and MS (1970) degrees in physics at Rutgers University. His PhD (1976) was awarded in a unique arrangement involving Purdue University (physics) and the University of Wisconsin Madison (history of science). He completed his dissertation on Werner Heisenberg's route to quantum mechanics under the guidance of Daniel M. Siegel (Wisconsin history of science), Norman Pearlman (Purdue physics), and Vernard Foley (Purdue history).

Career
1976–1977.  Research fellow with John L. Heilbron, Office for History of Science and Technology, University of California Berkeley.
1977–1980.  Research fellow of the Alexander von Humboldt Foundation with Armin Hermann, University of Stuttgart, Germany.
1980–1983. Assistant professor with  Imre Toth, University of Regensburg, Germany.
1983–1990.  Associate editor, The Collected Papers of Albert Einstein, Volumes 1 and 2, in Princeton and Boston.
1990–2015.  Associate and full professor, Hofstra University.
2015–present.  Professor emeritus, Hofstra University.

Honors
Cassidy's honors and awards include the History of Science Society's Pfizer Award, the American Institute of Physics' Science Writing Award, the Abraham Pais Prize of the American Physical Society, and an Honorary Doctorate of Science awarded by Purdue University.

Books
1987 and 1989.  Associate editor. The Collected Papers of Albert Einstein. Vols. 1 and 2. Princeton University Press, and online
1992. Uncertainty: The Life and Science of Werner Heisenberg. W. H. Freeman.
1995. Einstein and Our World. First ed., Prometheus Books ; second ed., Humanity Books, 2004.
2001. Werner Heisenberg: A Bibliography of His Writings. Second ed. Whittier Publications, and online
2002. With Gerald Holton and F. James Rutherford. Understanding Physics. Springer-Verlag, and online
2005 J. Robert Oppenheimer and the American Century. Pi Press; Johns Hopkins University Press, 2009; ebook, Plunkett Lake Press, 2017.
2009. Beyond Uncertainty: Heisenberg, Quantum Physics, and the Bomb. Revised and expanded edition of Uncertainty. Bellevue Literary Press.
2011. A Short History of Physics in the American Century. Harvard University Press.
2017. Farm Hall and the German Atomic Project of World War II: A Dramatic History. Springer-Verlag.
2019. With Allen Esterson and Ruth Lewin Sime, contributor. Einstein's Wife: The Real Story of Mileva Einstein-Marić. The MIT Press.

References

American historians of science
20th-century American historians
20th-century American male writers
21st-century American historians
21st-century American male writers
Hofstra University faculty
Rutgers University alumni
University of Wisconsin–Madison alumni
1945 births
Living people
American people of Armenian descent
American male non-fiction writers